SS Lafayette  was a  long Great Lakes bulk freighter that broke in two in the Mataafa Storm of 1905 near Encampment Island, Two Harbors, Minnesota. She was part of the "College Line" of ships; a group of five completely identical vessels named after the colleges attended by five of Pittsburgh Steamship's executives.

Lafayette was sailing with her barge Manilla which crashed into her when she ran ashore. The waves caused the ship to break in two, the stern stayed on the rocks, while the bow was pounded to pieces by the waters of Lake Superior. Only one life was lost. The ship was declared a total loss (the cost of the ship was about $300,000). The stern of Lafayette was used in 1909 to build the steamer J.S. Ashley.

References

Shipwrecks of Lake Superior
Maritime incidents in 1905
1900 ships
Ships built in Lorain, Ohio
Steamships of the United States
Great Lakes freighters
Shipwrecks of the Minnesota coast
Wreck diving sites in the United States
Ships sunk in storms